Topilo may refer to the following populated places:

Topilo Spa in south Serbia
Topiło, village in Podlaskie Voivodeship, Poland
Topilo, Štimlje, village in Kosovo